The List of Soviet military sites in Germany contains all military installations and units of the former Soviet Union on German territory. In correlation to Russian native document, original site designations of the Soviet armed forces are used as deemed to be necessary (e.g. later changes of site names are avoided). The units and formations were subordinated to the WGF Supreme Commands in Wünsdorf.

Baden-Württemberg

Berlin

Hessen

New states of Germany 

The tables below contains the location of military unit and formation of the Western Group of (Soviet) Forces (WGF) on territory of the New federal states of Germany with particularities as follows:

The English designation of military units and formations of the WGF (column 1) is in line to these in NATO, as deemed to be necessary. Honorary titles, names, or distinctions are omitted. In case of doubt, the original designation in Russian language is authoritative.

Supreme Command GSFG (WGF) and direct subordinates 
The Supreme Command GSFG (WGF) comprised the staff divisions and direct subordinated units, formations and facilities, as follows (in 1991):

1st Guards Tank Army Saxonia

2nd Guards Tank Army Brandenburg / Mecklenburg-Vorpommern

3rd Combined Arms Army Saxony-Anhalt

8th Guards Army Thuringia

16th Air Army

20th Guards Army Brandenburg

Units directly subordinated to the GSFG 
The following units were directly subordinated to the GSFG's headquarters.

References / sources

Sources 
 "The Radar Control Troops of the German Democratic Republic's Air Defence Forces", history and stories, by Wolf-Rüdiger Stuppe and Siefried Fiedle, 1st edition 2013 (p. 89-95, author L. Pflügner, Colonel r.), Publishing House Steffen/Steffen GmbH, .

Military facilities of the Soviet Union in Germany
Cold War sites in Germany